Argento is an Italian surname meaning "silver". Notable people with the surname include:

Asia Argento (born 1975), Italian actress
Claudio Argento (born 1940), Italian film-maker
Dario Argento (born 1940), Italian film-maker
Dominick Argento (1927-2019), American composer
Giuseppa Argento, spouse of Gaspare di Mercurio
Mariano Argento (born 1962), Argentine TV actor
Mike Argento (born 1958), American columnist and reporter from York
Mino Argento (born 1927), Italian painter
Tomás Argento (born 1986), Argentine hockey player
Valentino Argento (1901-1941), Italian fencer

See also
Argento Soma, a Japanese television programme
Nastro d'Argento, an Italian film award
Argento Chase, Grade 2 National Hunt steeplechase in Great Britain
PalaArgento, an indoor sporting arena in Naples, Italy
Argenti

Italian-language surnames